Jain International Residential School (JIRS), Bangalore is an institution also with weekly boarding facilities under The JGI Group on a  campus known as the Jain Global Campus which is JGI's main campus. JIRS has more than 750 students from India and from other countries. Jain Academy For Sporting Excellence (JASE) also operates on the campus with professional coaching since 2004. Classes for SAT, JEE are also conducted. It is a certified ISO 9001:2008 for international quality being an IB World School.

Education
The school is affiliated with Cambridge University's International General Certificate of Secondary Education (IGCSE, UK), the Central Board of Secondary Education (CBSE, India) and the International Baccalaureate Programme (IBDP) up to Grade 12.

Location
The school is located on Kanakapura road near Jakkasandra, Ramanagara district on the Bangalore National Highway (NH 209).

Facilities
Jain International Residential School provides sports, arts, and clubs to the students. Amenities such as food, medical needs, and dormitory are also provided in Jain International Residential School.

Organization and management
Jain International Residential School has over 750 students from all over the world. Chenraj Roychand is the Founder Chairman of the JGI Group. Retired Wing Commander Mr. K L Ganesh Sharma is the chief executive officer.

Recreation and spiritual centers
Jain International Residential Schools has indoor games which include chess, caroms, and scrabble.
The school has 4 temples in the campus and 35 exits.

References

External links
Official website

Educational institutions established in 1999
Cambridge schools in India
International schools in Bangalore
Boarding schools in Karnataka
1999 establishments in Karnataka